Marina Endicott (born September 14, 1958) is a Canadian novelist and short story writer. Her novel, Good to a Fault, won the 2009 Commonwealth Writers Prize for Canada and the Caribbean and was a finalist for the Giller Prize. Her next, The Little Shadows, was long-listed for the Giller and short-listed for the Governor General's Literary Award. Close to Hugh, was long-listed for the Giller Prize and named one of CBC's Best Books of 2015. Her latest, The Difference, won the City of Edmonton Robert Kroetsch prize. It was published in the US by W.W. Norton as The Voyage of the Morning Light in June 2020.

Personal life
Endicott was born in Golden, British Columbia in 1958, the daughter of an Anglican priest; she grew up in Vancouver, Halifax and Yarmouth, Nova Scotia, and Toronto, Ontario. She worked as an actor before moving to London, England, where she began to write fiction. Returning to Canada in 1984, she went west to Saskatoon and worked in theatre as a director and dramaturge. She was for many years the dramaturge of the Saskatchewan Playwrights Centre. In 1992 she went farther west with husband Peter Ormshaw to Mayerthorpe, Alberta, on his first posting with the RCMP; they have since lived in Cochrane, Edmonton, and Saskatoon. They have two children: Willow (1993) and Rachel (1996). They presently (2021) live in Saskatoon.

Writing career
Endicott was an actor, director, and dramaturge before beginning a second career as a writer of fiction.  When asked why she switched, she explained:
Being an actor isn't an easy life. The work is so ephemeral... I write novels instead of plays because I like the intimate link of the silent writer and the silent reader.

Endicott's first short story appeared in Grain in 1985. Her stories have been anthologized in Coming Attractions and short-listed for the 1993 Journey Prize. Her first novel, Open Arms (2001), was a finalist for the Amazon.ca/Books in Canada First Novel Award and was broadcast on CBC Radio's Between the Covers in 2003. Good to a Fault was selected for the 2010 edition of CBC Radio's Canada Reads. Her long poem about the Mayerthorpe incident, "The Policeman's Wife, Some Letters", was short-listed for the CBC Literary Awards in 2006. Her third novel, The Little Shadows, published by Doubleday in 2011, was longlisted for the Giller and shortlisted for the Governor General's Award for Fiction.

She co-wrote the screenplay for the 2012 documentary film, Vanishing Point.

Her novel Close to Hugh was published in May, 2015  and was longlisted for the Scotiabank Giller Prize.

Her 2019 novel, The Difference, Knopf Canada, won the Robert Kroetsch City of Edmonton Book Prize and the Dartmouth Fiction Award, and was one of the Globe & Mail's Best Books of 2019. It was published by W.W. Norton in the US as The Voyage of the Morning Light in June 2020.

Prize and honours
1993 Shortlist, Journey Prize
2003 Finalist, Amazon.ca/Books In Canada First Novel Award (for Open Arms)
2008 Finalist, Giller Prize (for Good to a Fault)
2009 Commonwealth Writers Prize for Best Book, Canada and the Caribbean (for Good to a Fault)
2010 Longlisted, International Dublin Literary Award
2011 Longlisted, Giller Prize (for The Little Shadows)
2011 Finalist, Governor General's Award for English-language fiction, Canada, (for The Little Shadows)
2015 Longlisted,  Giller Prize (for Close to Hugh)
2020 Robert Kroetsch City of Edmonton Book Prize (for The Difference)
2020 City of Dartmouth Fiction Prize (for The Difference)

Bibliography
 Open Arms (2001) Douglas & McIntyre 
 Good to a Fault (2008) Freehand Books 
 Open Arms (2009) Republished by Freehand Books
 New Year's Eve (2011) GoodReads/HarperCollins 
 The Little Shadows (2011) Doubleday Canada 
 Close to Hugh (2015) Doubleday Canada 
 The Difference (2019) Knopf Canada 
 The Voyage of the Morning Light (2020) W. W. Norton & Co

References

1958 births
Living people
Canadian women novelists
People from the Columbia-Shuswap Regional District
21st-century Canadian novelists
Canadian women short story writers
Writers from Saskatchewan
21st-century Canadian women writers
21st-century Canadian short story writers